Riding in Cars with Boys is a 2001 American biographical film based on the autobiography of the same name by Beverly Donofrio, about a woman who overcame difficulties, including being a teen mother, and who later earned a master's degree. The movie's narrative spans the years 1961 to 1985. It stars Drew Barrymore, Steve Zahn, Brittany Murphy, and James Woods. It was the last film directed by Penny Marshall. Although the film is co-produced by Beverly Donofrio, many of its details differ from the book.

Plot
In 1961, 11 year-old Beverly "Bev" Donofrio rides with her father, Wallingford, Connecticut police officer Leonard. She asks for a bra for Christmas to get the attention of a boy, but he tells her she is too young and to focus on books.

In 1965, intelligent but naïve, Bev's dream is to go to college in New York City to become a writer. Joining her friends Fay and Tina at a party, Fay's older boyfriend, Bobby, is being deployed to Vietnam while Bev gives a love letter to popular boy, Sky. He reads it aloud, so she flees to the bathroom where she's consoled by Ray, a stranger, who defends her honor by fighting with Sky.

Bev and Ray, with Fay and Bobby, flee the party and go to a lookout, where Bobby and Fay have sex. Bev is overcome by Ray's kindness, so they do too. On duty, Leonard catches and takes them to the police station, and Bev claims that they only kissed.

Bev tells Ray she's pregnant and initially turns down his offer to get married but later agrees to a hasty wedding to placate her parents. At the reception, everyone is avoiding Bev, so Fay publicly announces she is also pregnant. As Fay's father wanted her to put the baby up for adoption, she and Bobby will get married instead.

The girls celebrate that they will be mothers together, but lament missing out on their childhood, the prom, and an education. Bev has a son, Jason (upsetting her, as she wanted a girl), while Fay has daughter Amelia. Bev continues studying. When Jason is three, her interview for a college scholarship goes badly when she has to take Jason along. Although the interviewer praises her writing, he fears she is too distracted.

Later, Fay reveals that she and Bobby are getting divorced as he met someone else. Bev tells her she's not sure if she loves Jason because his birth has cost her so much. When he almost drowns in Fay's pool, Bev vows to be more attentive.

At Jason's seventh birthday party, several people from Bev's high school come: Tina is engaged and going to NYU; and Tommy, who had a crush on Bev, just graduated from Berkeley. He suggests she move her family to California to get her degree as the state offers financial aid. Although initially agreeing, Ray confesses to being a heroin addict and spending their savings on drugs. Bev helps him detox, but he sneaks out to get more drugs. Saying he can't quit, she tells him to leave. Ray agrees, but young Jason chases after him, telling Bev he hates her.

Two years later, Bev and Fay help Lizard (Ray's friend) to dry weed in Bev's oven to get money to study in California. Jason, still bitter, tells Grandpa Leonard, who arrests the mothers. Fay's brother bails them out, but only if Fay and Amelia move with him and cut off contact with Bev, so she blames Jason.

In 1986, Bev and Jason are driving to see Ray. She has a college degree and needs Ray to sign a waiver to publish her memoir. On the way, Jason tells her he wants to transfer from NYU to Indiana University, but Bev refuses as he must get the education she couldn't.

Jason calls his now-girlfriend Amelia with the bad news, who is dejected but not angry. Arriving at Ray's trailer, Bev explains why they are there. When his wife, Shirley, demands $100,000, Bev storms out. Jason follows, calling her selfish for only caring about her book when he finally got to see his father again. He accuses her of being a bad mother and she stomps off. Ray tells Jason leaving was the best thing he could have done for him and that is why he turned out so well. He sneaks the signed papers to him.

Jason finds Bev, who insists she was a great mother who sacrificed everything for him. He reveals he is transferring to be with Amelia and apologizes for ruining her life. Bev softens, telling him she is proud and that he is the best thing in her life. Feeling responsible for her mistakes and poor choices, she gives him her car to drive to Indiana.

Stranded, Beverly calls her father Leonard for a ride. Complaining that Jason blames her for everything wrong in his life, she realizes that she herself has done the same to him. Together, they sing a song from her childhood as they drive away.

Cast

Drew Barrymore as Beverly "Bev" Donofrio
Mika Boorem as Bev Donofrio, age 11
Marisa Ryan as Janet Donofrio
Olivia Morgan Scheck as Janet Donofrio, age 12
Celine Marget as Janet Donofrio, age 8 
Steve Zahn as Raymond "Ray" Hasek
Brittany Murphy as Fay Forrester
Adam Garcia as Jason Hasek-Donofrio
Joseph M. Cannizaro as Jason Hasek (newborn)
Noah Hartwick as Jason Hasek (3 months)  
Briana Tilden as Jason Hasek (8 months)
Skye Arens as Jason Hasek, age 1
Patrick and Robert Salerno as Jason Hasek, age 2  
Logan Arens as Jason Hasek, age 3  
Cody Arens as Jason Hasek, age 7
Logan Lerman as Jason Hasek, age 9
Lorraine Bracco as Mrs. Teresa Donofrio
James Woods as Mr. Leonard Donofrio
Maggie Gyllenhaal as Amelia
Samantha Reale as Amelia, age 3
Samantha Lucier as Amelia, age 7
Skye McCole Bartusiak as Amelia, age 9
Rosie Perez as Shirley Perro-Hasek
Desmond Harrington as Bobby
Sara Gilbert as Tina Barr
Peter Facinelli as Tommy Butcher
David Moscow as Lizard Hasek

Reception
Riding in Cars with Boys received mixed reviews. It holds a 49% rating on Rotten Tomatoes based on 109 reviews with an average rating of 5.3/10. The website's critical consensus reads: "Riding in Cars with Boys suffers from mixing grit and pathos with cuteness and comedy. Ironically, many critics found Zahn's character more compelling and three-dimensional than Barrymore's". Roger Ebert gave the film three out of four stars and wrote, "A film like this is refreshing and startling in the way it cuts loose from formula and shows us confused lives we recognize ... This movie is closer to the truth: A lot depends on what happens to you, and then a lot depends on how you let it affect you". In his review for The New York Times, Stephen Holden praised Steve Zahn's performance: "It is hard to imagine what Riding in Cars With Boys would have been without Mr. Zahn's brilliantly nuanced and sympathetic portrayal of Ray, who goes through more changes than Beverly". USA Today gave the film three out of four stars and found that the "strength of the movie lies in these performances and in the situational humor, though ultimately the ending is disappointing, attempting to wrap up loose ends far too neatly".

Lisa Schwarzbaum of Entertainment Weekly  gave the film a "C+" rating, and wrote, "... every scene is bumpered with actorly business and production detail that says more about nostalgia for the pop culture of earlier American decades than about the hard socioeconomic truths of being a poor, young, undereducated parent". In her review for The Washington Post, Rita Kempley criticized Barrymore's performance: "Barrymore, a delightful comic actress, has the spunk for the role, but can't do justice to the complexities of Beverly's conflicted personality. So she comes off as abrasive and neglectful as opposed to headstrong and ambitious, winning no empathy for this sour single mom". Edward Guthmann also had problems with Barrymore's performance in his review for the San Francisco Chronicle: "She never relaxes, never surrenders to the character, but instead tries to justify her and to make us like her despite her selfishness and poor mothering. American actors as a rule are terrified of playing unsympathetic characters, particularly when they've gained the celebrity and box-office appeal that Barrymore has". Giving the 2 out of 4 stars, Ron Weiskind of the Pittsburgh Post-Gazette called it "a troubling trip" and "is one bumpy ride".

Box office
Riding in Cars with Boys grossed $30.1 million in the United States and $35.7 million worldwide. Compared to its $47 million budget, the film was a box office bomb.

References

External links

Interviews with the cast

2001 comedy-drama films
2000s biographical drama films
2000s coming-of-age comedy-drama films
American biographical drama films
American coming-of-age comedy-drama films
Columbia Pictures films
Comedy-drama films based on actual events
Coming-of-age films based on actual events
Gracie Films films
Films based on biographies
Films directed by Penny Marshall
Films produced by James L. Brooks
Films produced by Laurence Mark
Films scored by Hans Zimmer
Films scored by Heitor Pereira
Films set in the 1960s
Films set in the 1970s
Films set in the 1980s
Films set in Connecticut
Films shot in Newark, New Jersey
Films shot in New Jersey
Films shot in New York (state)
Teenage pregnancy in film
Biographical films about writers
Films about drugs
Films about heroin addiction
American pregnancy films
Films about mother–son relationships
2000s English-language films
2000s American films